Pangasius indicus is an extinct species of catfish of the family Pangasiidae. This fish was a member of the "Sipang Fauna", a lagerstatte from Sipang, Sumatra, of indeterminate age, possibly either Eocene, Oligocene, or even Miocene in age.

References

Pangasiidae
Paleogene fish of Asia